Jawalapur  is a village in Kapurthala district of Punjab State, India. The village is administrated by a Sarpanch who is an elected representative.

Demography 
According to the 2011 Census of India, Jawalapur had 62 houses and a population of 309, of which 168 were male and 141 female. The literacy rate was 78.06%, higher than the state average of 75.84%.  The population of children in the age group 0–6 years was 31, being 10.03% of the total population.  The child sex ratio was approximately 824, lower than the state average of 846.

Population data

References

External links 
  Villages in Kapurthala
 Kapurthala Villages List

Villages in Kapurthala district